Harry Collins (born 1943) is an English academic.

Harry Collins may also refer to:

 Harry J. Collins (1895–1963), US Army general
 Rip Collins (pitcher) (Harry Warren Collins, 1896–1968), American baseball pitcher 
 Harry Collins (footballer) (1892–1918), Australian rules footballer
 Harry Collins (magician) (1920–1985), official corporate magician for the Frito-Lay company

See also
 Henry Collins (disambiguation)
 Harold Collins (disambiguation)
 Collins (surname)
 Harry Collinson Owen (1882–1956), British journalist and author